Edward Albert Barry (8 June 1898 – 24 November 1965) was an English cricketer. A left-handed batsman and left-arm medium pace bowler, he played two first-class matches for Ireland in the summer of 1926, against Oxford University and Scotland. He did not play for Ireland again.

References
CricketEurope Stats Zone profile

1898 births
1965 deaths
English cricketers
Ireland cricketers
British expatriates in Hong Kong